The Silent Barrier is a 1920 American silent drama film directed by William Worthington and starring Sheldon Lewis, Corinne Barker and Gladys Hulette. It is based on the 1909 novel of the same title by the British writer Louis Tracy. Much of the film takes place in the resort town St. Moritz.

Cast
 Sheldon Lewis as Mark Bower
 Corinne Barker as Millicent Jacques
 Florence Dixon as Helen Wynton
 Donald Cameron as Charles K. Spencer
 Gladys Hulette as Etta Stampa
 Adolph Milar as Stampa
 Ernest Des Baillets as 	Barth
 Fuller Mellish as McKenzie
 Joseph Burke as Professor Lammenois
 Mathilde Brundage as Lady Lavasour
 John Raymond as Sir George Lavasour 
 Robert Lee Keeling as Delavere

References

Bibliography
 Munden, Kenneth White. The American Film Institute Catalog of Motion Pictures Produced in the United States, Part 1. University of California Press, 1997.

External links
 

1920 films
1920 drama films
1920s English-language films
American silent feature films
Silent American drama films
American black-and-white films
Films directed by William Worthington
Films distributed by W. W. Hodkinson Corporation
Pathé Exchange films
Films based on British novels
Films set in England
Films set in Switzerland
1920s American films